PB-43 (Panjgur-II) is a constituency of the Provincial Assembly of Balochistan.

See also

 Balochistan
 Provincial Assembly of Balochistan

References

External links
 Election commission Pakistan's official website
 Awazoday.com check result
 Balochistan's Assembly official site

Constituencies of Balochistan